Dodge Brook State Forest is a protected area in the town of Lempster, New Hampshire. It was purchased by the state in 1919 for reforestation. It is located on both sides of New Hampshire Route 10 with a larger parcel on the east side. The west parcel abuts Dodge Brook and has been home to stands of larch. The area was logged for spruce a couple years before it was originally purchased.

See also

List of New Hampshire state forests

References

External links
 U.S. Geological Survey Map at the U.S. Geological Survey Map Website. Retrieved January 5th, 2022.

New Hampshire state forests
Lempster, New Hampshire